The 1967 NCAA University Division Cross Country Championships were the 29th annual cross country meet to determine the team and individual national champions of men's collegiate cross country running in the United States. Held on November 27, 1967, the meet was hosted by the University of Wyoming at the War Memorial Fieldhouse in Laramie, Wyoming. The distance for this race was 6 miles (9.7 kilometers).

All NCAA University Division members were eligible to qualify for the meet. In total, 14 teams and 112 individual runners contested this championship.

The team national championship was retained by the Villanova Wildcats, their second title. The individual championship was also retained by Gerry Lindgren, from Washington State, with a time of 30:45.60.

Men's title
Distance: 6 miles (9.7 kilometers)

Team Result (Top 10)

See also
NCAA Men's Division II Cross Country Championship

References
 

NCAA Cross Country Championships
NCAA University Division Cross Country Championships
NCAA Division I Cross Country Championships
NCAA Division I Cross Country Championships
Laramie, Wyoming
Track and field in Wyoming
Wyoming Cowboys and Cowgirls